Trinity is a village in Angus, Scotland. It lies approximately one mile north-west of Brechin on the B966 Brechin to Edzell road. It was the location of the toll house to the Strathmore turnpike, operating from 1794 to 1879.

References

See also
Brechin

Villages in Angus, Scotland